Banban Bridge is a highway bridge in Central Luzon, Philippines which is part of the MacArthur Highway (N2).

The bridge was constructed from 1996 to 1998 as part of the rehabilitation efforts on National Highway 3 following the 1991 eruption of Mount Pinatubo.

References

Buildings and structures in Tarlac
Through arch bridges in the Philippines